Hässleholm Municipality (Hässleholms kommun) is a municipality in Scania County in southern Sweden.  Its seat is located in the city Hässleholm.

The present municipality was created in 1974 when the former City of Hässleholm, itself incorporated in 1914, was amalgamated with seven surrounding municipalities.  In 1863, there were 29 local government units, all rural, in the area.

The municipal coat of arms was granted in 1920 and registered for the new municipality in 1974. The cross symbolizes the railway junction, which is the origin of the town Hässleholm. The hazelnuts allude to the name Hässleholm, which roughly translates as "Hazel-isle".

Geography 
At 1,306.27 km2 Hässleholm is the second largest municipality in Skåne County by total area. By land area Hässleholm is the largest in Scania County with 1,268.53 km2 (Kristianstad Municipality short after with 1,246.25 km2), much due to its relatively small water area of 37.74 km2.

Localities
There are 17 urban areas (also called a Tätort or locality) in Hässleholm Municipality.

In the table the localities are listed according to the size of the population as of December 31, 2020.  The municipal seat is in bold characters.

Industry
Hässleholms Workshops
Göinge Mechanical Workshop
Hässleholms Brewery
Hässleholms Kapsyl- och Stanniolfabrik
Hässleholms Filfabrik

Sport in Hässleholm
 IFK Hässleholm

Twin towns
 Darłowo, Poland
 Eckernförde, Germany
 Nykøbing-Rørvig, Denmark

Notable residents

 Bengt Bauler
 Johan T Karlsson
 Ida-Theres Nerell
 Pia Hansen
 Andreas Tilliander
 Grönwalls 
 Andreas Dahl, football (soccer) player
 Jon Jönsson, football (soccer) player
 Ingrid Swede, film
 Jan Brink 
 Åke "Kometen" Persson
 Jeanette Thelander
 Anders S. Nilsson
 Glenn Wish
 Neneh Cherry, Swedish-American singer born here but raised in London and New York City
 Martin Ingvarsson
 Joddla med Siv
Freddie Ljungberg, footballer born in Vittsjö, but grew up in Halmstad
Nilla Fischer, footballer
Gustav Fridolin, Sweden's youngest parliament member, now a journalist for Kalla Fakta
Bildsköne Bengtsson
Peps Persson, musician
KG Hammar, former archbishop
Gunhild Sehlin

References
 Statistics Sweden

External links

 Hässleholm Municipality - Official site

 
Municipalities of Skåne County